Lauren Smith (born 26 September 1991) is an English badminton player. She competed for England in the women's doubles and mixed team events at the 2014 Commonwealth Games where she won a bronze and silver medal respectively. In 2016, she represented Great Britain at the Summer Olympics in Rio de Janeiro, Brazil.

Teamed-up with Gabby Adcock, she won the women's doubles gold medals at the English National Badminton Championships in 2013 and 2014. In 2015 and 2016, she also won the women's doubles title partnered with Heather Olver.

Smith qualified to represent Great Britain at the 2019 European Games, played in the women's doubles with Chloe Birch and in the mixed doubles with Marcus Ellis. Competed as the unseeded and second seeds in the women's and mixed doubles event respectively, she reached the finals in both events. She and Birch managed to claim the silver medal after lose a match to Dutch pair in the rubber games. She then claimed the mixed doubles gold medal with Ellis; they beat their compatriots Chris Adcock and Gabby Adcock by the score 21–14, 21–9.

Career 
Smith played at the 2020 Summer Olympics in the women's doubles with Chloe Birch and in the mixed doubles with Marcus Ellis. At the Games, she was eliminated in the group stage and quarter-finals respectively. It was also revealed by the Olympic committee that she is dating her partner Marcus.

Achievements

Commonwealth Games 

Women's doubles

Mixed doubles

European Games 
Women's doubles

Mixed doubles

European Championships 
Women's doubles

Mixed doubles

European Junior Championships 
Mixed doubles

BWF World Tour (6 titles, 4 runners-up) 
The BWF World Tour, which was announced on 19 March 2017 and implemented in 2018, is a series of elite badminton tournaments sanctioned by the Badminton World Federation (BWF). The BWF World Tour is divided into levels of World Tour Finals, Super 1000, Super 750, Super 500, Super 300, and the BWF Tour Super 100.

Women's doubles

Mixed doubles

BWF Grand Prix (1 title, 2 runners-up) 
The BWF Grand Prix had two levels, the Grand Prix and Grand Prix Gold. It was a series of badminton tournaments sanctioned by the Badminton World Federation (BWF) and played between 2007 and 2017.

Women's doubles

Mixed doubles

  BWF Grand Prix Gold tournament
  BWF Grand Prix tournament

BWF International Challenge/Series (13 titles, 15 runners-up)
Women's doubles

Mixed doubles

  BWF International Challenge tournament
  BWF International Series tournament

References

External links 
 
 

1991 births
Living people
Sportspeople from Carlisle, Cumbria
English female badminton players
Badminton players at the 2016 Summer Olympics
Badminton players at the 2020 Summer Olympics
Olympic badminton players of Great Britain
Badminton players at the 2014 Commonwealth Games
Badminton players at the 2018 Commonwealth Games
Badminton players at the 2022 Commonwealth Games
Commonwealth Games silver medallists for England
Commonwealth Games bronze medallists for England
Commonwealth Games medallists in badminton
Badminton players at the 2019 European Games
European Games gold medalists for Great Britain
European Games silver medalists for Great Britain
European Games medalists in badminton
Medallists at the 2014 Commonwealth Games
Medallists at the 2018 Commonwealth Games
Medallists at the 2022 Commonwealth Games